Jean-Christophe Maillot (born 1960) is a French dancer and choreographer born in Tours.

Early life and education 

He studied at the dance conservatory in Tours before enrolling at the École supérieure de danse de Cannes Rosella Hightower, where Rosella Hightower was his primary teacher.

Career 
Maillot was invited by John Neumeier to join the Hamburg Ballet in 1978, where he became a soloist and stayed until 1983, when an accident ended his career as a dancer.

In 1983, he became the choreographer and director of the Ballet du Grand Théâtre in Tours.  Since 1993,  on the appointment of Caroline, Princess of Hanover, he has been the artistic director of Les Ballets de Monte Carlo.

He helped Princess Caroline design the bridesmaids costumes at the wedding of her brother.

In 2000, 2012 and 2023 was a head of a jury at Prix de Lausanne ballet competitions.

Works 
Works created for Les Ballets des Monte-Carlo: Bêtes Noires; Home, Sweet Home; Dov’è la Luna; Vers un Pays Sage; Roméo et Juliette; Recto Verso; L’Île; Cendrillon; Entrelacs; Oeil pour oeil; La Belle; D’une rive à l’autre; Miniatures; Le Songe; Altro Canto; Casse-Noisette Circus (2000). For the Bolshoi Theater, he created The Taming of The Shrew.

 1987 : Le Mandarin Merveilleux
 1989 : Über die Winterreise
 1989 : Du haut de ...
 1991 : L'enfant et les sortilèges
 1993 : Bêtes noires
 1993 : Lueurs d'amour
 1993 : Thème et quatre variation
 1994 : Home Sweet Home
 1994 : Dov'e la Luna
 1995 : Ubuaha
 1995 : Vers un pays sage
 1996 : Concert d'anges	
 1996 : Roméo et Juliette
 1997 : Duo d'anges
 1997 : Recto verso
 1997 : In volo
 1998 : L'Île
 1999 : Cendrillon
 1999 : Casse-noisette circus
 2000 : Opus 40
 2000 : Entrelacs
 2001 : Œil pour œil
 2001 : La Belle	
 2002 : Men's Dance
 2003 : D'une rive à l'autre
 2003 : Noces
 2004 : Miniatures
 2005 : Le Songe
 2006 : Altro canto I
 2007 : Faust
 2008 : Altro Canto II
 2009 : Schéhérazade
 2009 : Men's Dance for Women
 2009 : Fauves
 2010 : Daphnis et Chloé
 2011 : Opus 50
 2011 : Lac
 2013 : Choré
 2013 : Casse-Noisette Compagnie
 2014 : La Mégère Apprivoisée - Ballet du Théâtre Bolchoï
 2015 : Presque Rien
 2016 : Aleatorio
 2017 : La Mégère Apprivoisée

Distinctions & awards 
 1977: Prix de Lausanne
 1992:  Knighthood of the Ordre des Arts et des Lettres
 1999:  Officer of the Order of Cultural Merit of Monaco
 2001:  Nijinski Award for Best Choreography for the production of La Belle
 2002:  Knighthood of the Légion d'honneur
 2007: Prix Benois de la Danse Choreographer of the Year for "Faust"
 2015: Commander of the Order of Arts and Letters
 2018: Prix de Lausanne Life Time Achievement Award

Personal life 
He and his wife, Valentine, have three children, born between 1986-1992.  His daughter, Juliette Dol, is a French actress.

Footnotes 

French male ballet dancers
French choreographers
1960 births
Prix Benois de la Danse winners
Living people
Prix de Lausanne winners
Commandeurs of the Ordre des Arts et des Lettres
Commanders of the Order of Cultural Merit (Monaco)